Godar-e Zard may refer to:
 Godar-e Zard, Kerman